Alzheon is an American clinical-stage biopharmaceutical company based in Framingham, Massachusetts. The company is developing medicines for patients with Alzheimer's disease and other neurological and psychiatric disorders.

History

Alzheon was founded in July 2013 by Martin Tolar, MD, PhD, a veteran of Alzheimer's drug programs, who serves as president and CEO of the organization. Alzheon completed a $10 million Series A round of financing in April 2015 and started the Phase lb bridging clinical program for ALZ-801, which was completed in July 2016.

In August 2018, Alzheon appointed former IVAX President Neil Flanzraich, JD, as Vice Chairman of Board of Directors.

In August 2020, Alzheon was awarded a $47 million grant over five years from the U.S. National Institute on Aging, part of the National Institutes of Health. The grant is to support the Phase 3 clinical trial of ALZ-801 that began in May 2021

Pipeline

Alzheon's leading candidate, ALZ-801, is an oral prodrug of the active agent tramiprosate that targets neurotoxic soluble amyloid oligomers, and received Fast Track designation from the FDA in 2017.

ALZ-801 oral tablet is being evaluated in Phase 2 biomarker study in early Alzheimer's disease patients with homozygous and heterozygous APOE4 genotype.

ALZ-801 is also in Phase 3 clinical development for high-risk homozygous APOE4/4 patients with early Alzheimer's Disease. Patients with two alleles of APOE4 have up to 20 times the risk of developing Alzheimer's disease.

Alzheon completed a $50 million Series D in April 2022 and will use the funds to complete ALZ-801 clinical trials.

References

Biopharmaceutical companies
Pharmaceutical companies of the United States
Companies based in Framingham, Massachusetts
Pharmaceutical companies established in 2013
Health care companies based in Massachusetts